Easwaramoorthy (Soranam) was an Indian politician and former Member of the Legislative Assembly. He was elected to the Tamil Nadu legislative assembly as a Communist Party of India (Marxist) candidate from Ambasamudram constituency in 1977 and 1980 elections.

References 

Communist Party of India (Marxist) politicians from Tamil Nadu
Living people
Year of birth missing (living people)
Tamil Nadu MLAs 1977–1980
Tamil Nadu MLAs 1980–1984